Sahil Deshmukh Khan (born 4 December 1997) is an Indian tv actor working in Hindi Serials. He started his tv carrier from Zee Tv serial Aapki Antara as Abhishek. He acted in Bharat Ka Veer Putra Maharana Pratap as "Young Akbar" but had to leave the show as he was diagnosed with leukemia.

Television

References

External links 
 http://timesofindia.indiatimes.com/tv/news/hindi/Sahil-DeshmukhBharat-Ka-Veer-Putra-Maharana-Pratap/articleshow/24149387.cms

1997 births
Living people